Werner Winsemann was a German-born former football referee. He officiated at the 1974 FIFA World Cup as a referee and linesman. At the 1978 FIFA World Cup he officiated as a linesman (now called assistant referee) only. He is the only Canadian referee selected for a FIFA World Cup.

Winsemann also worked the football tournaments of the 1972 Olympic Games and 1976.

Main games as main referee 
 Olympic Games 1972, First round, Group D: 12/09/1972, Poland-East Germany (2-1) - 1 yellow card given
 1974 FIFA World Cup, First round, Groupe C: 19/06/1974: Netherlands-Sweden (0-0) - 5 yellow cards given.
 Olympic Games 1976, First round, Group A: 22/07/1976, East Germany-Spain (1-0) - 5 yellow cards given

External links
 / Canada Soccer Hall of Fame
 Info on worldreferee.com

1933 births
German emigrants to Canada
Canadian soccer referees
Olympic football referees
1974 FIFA World Cup referees
FIFA World Cup referees
Living people